Kulgunino (Qolğona) is a rural locality (a selo) and the administrative centre of Kulguninsky Selsoviet, Ishimbaysky District, Bashkortostan, Russia. The population was 774 as of 2010. There are 14 streets.

Geography 
Kulgunino is located 81 km east of Ishimbay (the district's administrative centre) by road. Kalu-Ayry is the nearest rural locality.

References 

Rural localities in Ishimbaysky District